Djesse Vol. 2 is the second album in the Djesse series by Jacob Collier, released 19 July 2019. Djesse is a planned collection of four volumes which was announced 29 October 2018, each describing a different part of the day. It has been suggested that the title Djesse, which is pronounced with a silent D, is a reference to Collier's own initials. 

The first single from Djesse Vol. 2, "Make Me Cry", was released on 12 April 2019. A 360° music video was released for the single on 16 April 2019. On 26 April 2019, the second single from the volume was released, a cover of the Beatles' "Here Comes the Sun", and was produced in collaboration with Dodie Clark. Collier and Clark directed and also recorded the music video themselves. 

The cover of "Moon River" opens with a 144-part choir featuring the voices of famous musicians (including Herbie Hancock, Quincy Jones, Tori Kelly, Chris Martin, Charlie Puth, and Hans Zimmer); Collier's collaborators from Djesse Vol. 1 and Vol. 2; students and professors from Oakwood University and MIT (including the MIT Festival Jazz Ensemble); Collier's own immediate family; Collier's studio & live sound engineering and management teams; and June Lee, a YouTuber known for his transcriptions of Collier's work. It also includes roughly 5000 different vocal recordings of Collier, making use of just intonation and of Collier's distinctive microtonal tunings. The track "Moon River" on the album won the Grammy Award for Best Arrangement, Instrumental or A Cappella in the 62nd Annual Grammy Awards.

The volume features collaborations with Sam Amidon, Dodie Clark, Lianne La Havas, JoJo, MARO, Oumou Sangaré, Becca Stevens, Chris Thile, Kathryn Tickell, and Steve Vai. Collier has been on the Djesse world tour since the release of the first volume.

Track listing

Personnel
Adapted from album's liner notes and Tidal.

Jacob Collier – vocals, instruments, arrangements, engineering, producer, and mixing

Additional musicians

 Sam Amidon – vocals, banjo, and fiddle 
 Josh Arcoleo – tenor saxophone 
 Max Baillie – viola 
 Bill Bland – percussion and additional vocals 
 David Cohen – cello 
 Sophie Collier – additional vocals 
 Suzie Collier – additional vocals 
 Fabio De Oliveira – percussion and additional vocals 
 Caroline Dearnley – cello 
 dodie – featured vocals, clarinet, and clapping 
 Ruth Gibson – viola 
 Thomas Gould – violin 
 Magnus Johnston – violin 
 JoJo – featured vocals 
 Giumba Kouyaté – additional acoustic guitar 
 Lianne La Havas – featured vocals 
 James Maddren – additional drums 
 MARO – featured vocals , additional vocals 
 Robin Mullarkey – additional bass 
 Jose Ortega – spoken word 
 Pino Palladino – electric bass 
 David Pattman – background vocals and percussion 
 Hammadi Rencurrell – percussion and additional vocals 
 Oumou Sangaré – featured vocals and clapping 
 Barak Schmool – percussion and additional vocals 
 Becca Stevens – featured vocals , additional vocals 
 Kathryn Tickell – Northumbrian pipes 
 Chris Thile – mandolin 
 Steve Vai – electric guitar 

Additional technical personnel
 Chris Allgood – mastering
 Ben Bloomberg – mix engineer 
 Tom Chichester-Clark – percussion recording engineer 
 Aviv Cohen – percussion recording engineer 
 Fiona Cruickshank – string sextet recording engineer 
 Ryan Gladieux – vocal engineer 
 Emily Lazar – mastering
 Ed McEntee – recording engineer 
 Ross Newbauer – assistant mixer 
 Kerry Pompeo – assistant recording engineer 
 James Yost – mandolin recording engineer 
 Joe Zook – mixing engineer

References 

Jacob Collier albums
2019 albums